Kotenkosius is a genus of braconid wasps in the family Braconidae. There is at least one described species in Kotenkosius, K. tricarinatus, found in Indomalaya.

References

Microgastrinae
Insects described in 2018